Pezoloma is a genus of fungi within the Leotiaceae family.

References

External links
Index Fungorum

Helotiales
Taxa named by Frederic Clements